Boris Borisovich Ryzhy (8 September 1974 – 7 May 2001) was a Russian poet and geologist. Some poems by Ryzhy have been translated into English, Italian, German, Dutch and Serbian. He committed suicide on 7 May 2001, at the age of 26. He was born in Chelyabinsk, but had lived in Sverdlovsk (renamed Yekaterinburg after the dissolution of the Soviet Union) since 1980.

Family and death 
At the time of his death, Ryzhy's reputation had burgeoned and he was starting to receive recognition as one of the premier poets of his generation. He was awarded the Anti-Booker Prize and accepted an invitation to the Rotterdam Poetry Festival. 
Ryzhy took his own life by hanging on 7 May 2001, at the age of 26. His suicide, seen by many skeptics as a desperate plea for recognition and fame (the kind of which has been popular in Russia since Sergei Esenin's suicide in a St. Petersburg hotel in 1925), was a sad consequence of his bipolar disorder and substance abuse. Shortly afterwards, he was posthumously awarded the Northern Palmyra, one of the most highly sought-after prizes in Russian poetry, for his collection Opravdaniye zhizni ("A Reason to Live").

His only son, Artem (born 19 January 1993) died of a cardiac arrest in September 2020, at the age of 27.

Legacy 

Since his death in 2001, his poetry has been lauded and added to the canon of Russian poets. Many of his poems and collections have been added to the volumes of essential literature in the last several years, and he has gained huge popularity for his verse, which is at times vulgar and swaggering, at times formally masterful and reminiscent of Russia's Silver Age. Through his short, poignant lyrics he crafted a persona of post-Soviet delinquency and despair. His own depression and addiction to alcohol figure prominently. He was from the intelligentsia class, and had an impressive education in geology and nuclear geophysics and published many scientific papers.

Curiously, his reputation has been slow to grow outside of Russia. Following his death, a few translations have appeared in English, Italian, German, Dutch and Spanish.

Aliona van der Horst made the documentary Boris Ryzhy in 2009, and has received several awards including the Best Feature Documentary at the Edinburgh International Film Festival 2009.

Belarusian post-punk band Molchat Doma adapted the lyrics for their 2018 song Судно ("Vessel"), from Ryzhy's poem Эмалированное судно ("Enameled Vessel").

Notes

References

External links
http://www.borisryzhy.com/
  Poet Boris Ryzhy
http://jhstotts.blogspot.com/2008/05/boris-ryzhii-new-translations.html
http://viewpoint-east.org/2010/03/30/boris-ryzhy-the-unwilling-survivor/
http://magazines.russ.ru/ural/2011/5/ry9.html
http://www.oblgazeta.ru/home.htm?st=7-2.sat&dt=28 May 2011
http://www.oblgazeta.ru/print_v.htm?st=7-2.sat&dt=28 May 2011
https://web.archive.org/web/20121021030239/http://www.litrossia.ru/2011/25/06283.html
https://web.archive.org/web/20121021034915/http://www.litrossia.ru/2011/41/06546.html 
http://parus.ruspole.info/node/1780
http://mars.arbicon.ru/index.php?mdl=content&id=95753
http://magazines.russ.ru/sib/2012/1/r15.html
http://www.uralstalker.su/archive/us/2012/02/120236.html
http://parus.ruspole.info/node/2067
http://magazines.russ.ru/studio/2011/15/r20.html

Russian male poets
1974 births
2001 deaths
2001 suicides
20th-century Russian poets
20th-century Russian male writers
Ural State University alumni
Suicides in Russia